Osmaston is a suburb of the city of Derby, England. It is situated about 4 km south of the city centre. It is written in the Domesday Book as Osmundestune. In 1307 the manor of Osmaston was granted to Robert Holland. It was the location of Osmaston Hall the residence of the Wilmot baronets of Osmaston.

History
There are two places called Osmaston in Derbyshire. This Osmaston and another in the Derbyshire Dales. It has been this way for at least 900 years. Both places are mentioned in the Domesday Book and both called Osmundestune.
The manor in Derby was the home of the ancient family of the Wilmot baronets. These baronets built Osmaston Hall which included its own chapel of James the Lesser. The hall was demolished to make way for Ascot Drive industrial estate in 1938, whilst the chapel managed to survive until 1952.

The area was called The Osmaston Triangle, an area of Derby bounded by a railway line, Osmaston Road and Osmaston Park Road, with the two roads joining at the "Spider Bridge" in Allenton.  In 2003 a major project called the 'Osmaston Housing Improvement Zone' was approved, designed to improve the condition of the local housing. This work included much of the older, privately owned terraced houses in the area with 20 empty properties brought back into use and 93 low-income families helped with essential repairs. 
An arson incident occurred on Victory Road on 11 May 2012, which led to the deaths of six children.

Rolls-Royce
From 1908 till 2007, Osmaston was the main location of the manufacturing unit of Rolls-Royce, until this facility was moved 2 km south to Sinfin. The Nightingale Road, Main Works site opened in 1908 to manufacture the Rolls-Royce Silver Ghost The rear of the site had a test track called "Miniature Brooklands" which was used to prove the cars.

During World War II, on Monday 27 July 1942, at 7.50 am a lone Dornier Do 217 attacked the Rolls-Royce factory in the area, which was making Merlin Engines and vital to the war effort.  The aircraft, at very low level, hit the central stores and the houses opposite with four bombs, three 550kg and one 250 kg. The plane then turned, strafed civilians in the Osmaston area and shot down a barrage balloon before returning to base.  Twenty-three people were killed, 12 in the works with the remainder in neighbouring houses in Hawthorn, Abingdon and Handel Street. Among those killed was Arthur Bacon a former Derby County football player. A further 120 people were injured.

On 27 July 2017, a memorial to those who died was unveiled behind the Marble Hall. Guest of honour was Sheila Dixon who was nine years old when one of the bombs impacted two doors down from her home, killing her friend Dennis Regan.

In April 2009, Derby City Council agreed to buy the old Rolls-Royce site in a move towards the ongoing regeneration of Osmaston.

Education
Schools serving the Osmaston area are Nightingale Infant and Primary schools, who both have "Inadequate" Ofsted reports.

Religious sites
Saint Bartholomew's Parish Church serves the area. The church was built in 1926, on land given by Mrs Walter Evans and was extended in 1966 to give a new Chancel, Lady Chapel and Vestries.

Osmaston Park
At the southern edge of Osmaston is a public park called Osmaston Park. It is 650 metres long by 250 metres wide with a pathed perimeter of 1,500 metres. It has two grassed areas set aside as football pitches, either side of a central wooded circle called "Ash Wood" with an adventure playground. The park features basketball courts a community centre and BMX track.

Notable people
Sir John Eardley Wilmot (1709–1792), Chief Justice of the Common Pleas
Henry Royce

See also
St Osmund's Church, Derby

References

External links

Areas of Derby
Former civil parishes in Derbyshire